Chryseobacterium caeni  is a Gram-negative and non-spore-forming bacteria from the genus of Chryseobacterium which has been isolated from bioreactor sludge in Daejeon in Korea.

References

Further reading

External links
Type strain of Chryseobacterium caeni at BacDive -  the Bacterial Diversity Metadatabase

Flavobacteria
Bacteria described in 2007